A list of films produced in France in 1984.

Notes

External links
 1984 in France
 French films of 1984 at the Internet Movie Database
French films of 1984 at Cinema-francais.fr

1984
Films
French